Alexandru "Alex" Papană (18 October 1906 – 17 April 1946) was a Romanian-American aviator and bobsledder who competed from the early 1930s to the late 1940s.

Bobsleigh career
Competing for Romania in bobsleigh, he won two medals in the two-man event at the FIBT World Championships with a gold in 1933 and a bronze in 1934. Papană also competed in two Winter Olympics, earning his best finish of fourth in the two-man event at Lake Placid, New York in 1932. He retired from bobsledding after the 1936 Winter Olympics.

Aviation career
Papană obtained his pilot's license in 1928 while in Romania, and was already setting altitude records in 1931. At the 1936 Summer Olympics in Berlin, he competed in gliding (which was a demonstration sport), finishing a respectable 12th as the only representative from Romania. This earned him an invitation to an aerobatics competition in Los Angeles.

Papană accepted the offer, and he and his plane, a Bücker Bü 133B Jungermeister (one of only two versions of that variant ever produced) with the registration YR-PAX, were flown from Frankfurt, Germany to New York, New York aboard the Hindenburg airship in August 1936. He then flew across the United States from New York to Los Angeles, winning the race between the cities. In Los Angeles, he won the national air races that were held there. In December of that year, Papană finished second with the Jungermeister in a race from Miami, Florida to Havana, Cuba.

At an airshow in Cleveland, Ohio the following year, Papană was in a battle with fellow aviator Count Hagenburg that ended up crashing the count's aircraft. Papană offered Hagenburg his aircraft, but the count refused.

Papană's aircraft was damaged on the runway at an airport in Chicago, Illinois in 1940. The plane was sold twice before being donated to the Smithsonian Institution in 1973. The aircraft is now located at the Steven F. Udvar-Hazy Center in Chantilly, Virginia.

Papană later tested gliders for Northrop as a test pilot, many of his flights being documented in Flying magazine. He was involved in the trials for the P-61 Black Widow aircraft that would be involved during World War II for the United States Army Air Forces.

Other activities
Papană was also active in his youth as a goalkeeper, competing for Colţea București.

Personal life
Papană was born in Bucharest. He was married twice. His first wife Dina in 1938 died while in childbirth on 5 September of that year. He remarried to Jean Hacker on 30 April 1945, but their marriage in Beverly Hills, California did not go well.

He died on 17 April 1946 after abandoning his car 17 miles (27 km) south of Las Vegas, Nevada. Authorities discovered Papană's body six days later with a suicide note. Papană died by poisoning.

References
Aeroclubul Romania profile
Bobsleigh two-man world championship medalists since 1931
Bucker museum featuring Papană's plane
Coltea Bucuresti football (soccer) club featuring Papană.
List of Romanian-Americans featuring Papană
Wallechinsky, David (1984). "Bobsled". In The Complete Book of the Olympics: 1896-1980. New York: Penguin Books. pp. 558, 560.

External links
 

1906 births
1946 suicides
American aviators
Bobsledders at the 1932 Winter Olympics
Bobsledders at the 1936 Winter Olympics
Glider pilots at the 1936 Summer Olympics
Olympic bobsledders of Romania
Romanian emigrants to the United States
Romanian aviators
Romanian male bobsledders
Romanian footballers
Suicides by poison
Suicides in Nevada
Glider pilots
Sportspeople from Bucharest
American aviation record holders
Association football goalkeepers